Samuel Álvarez (born 22 February 1974) is a Mexican boxer. He competed in the men's bantamweight event at the 1996 Summer Olympics.

References

External links
 

1974 births
Living people
Mexican male boxers
Olympic boxers of Mexico
Boxers at the 1996 Summer Olympics
Place of birth missing (living people)
Bantamweight boxers